Cameron Troy Duncan (20 April 1986 – 12 November 2003) was a filmmaker from New Zealand.

Biography

Life and film career
Duncan was of Māori descent and was raised in Auckland and attended Avondale College. Duncan completed many home videos but finished only two short films, DFK6498 and Strike Zone. The former dealt with his cancer diagnosis and subsequent loss of freedom, drawing analogy between the limitations imposed by the disease and a prison sentence. The latter film was devoted to his love of softball. Both films received recognition at the Wanganui Rivercity Film Festival. In 2002 DFK6498 won the best script and the viewers choice awards, with Duncan winning the best director award, while in 2003, Strike Zone won the best film award. He was also successful in the Fair Go Ad Awards, with his entries in 1999 and 2003 winning the award for best high school entries in their respective years. The advertisement he created for the 1999 competition was officially adopted by TVNZ and played on television for its message concerning road safety. He flew to Tijuana, Mexico for alternative treatment for his bone cancer. He died on 12 November 2003 in Texas at the age of 17.

Relationship with Lord of the Rings
Near the end of his life he befriended Peter Jackson and Fran Walsh. His illness also helped to inspire Fran Walsh to write the lyrics for the Oscar-winning song, "Into the West" for the film The Lord of the Rings: The Return of the King. After his death, his work as well as an explanatory documentary was put onto the Extended Edition DVD set for The Return of the King.

On the set of The Lord of the Rings: The Return of the King, he received blessings from Viggo Mortensen and Sir Ian McKellen as well as a signed photo from John Rhys-Davies. He was going to make a cameo in the film, but as his health deteriorated, it became impossible for him to do so.

Legal battle after death
Duncan's family have made approaches through the NZ ethics system to use his frozen sperm. His sister and her female partner want to use the sperm and it is alleged that his mother has ownership rights.

References

External links

 
 

1986 births
2003 deaths
Deaths from cancer in Texas
Deaths from bone cancer
New Zealand film directors
People educated at Avondale College